Voulmentin is a commune in the Deux-Sèvres department in Nouvelle-Aquitaine region in western France. The result of the merger, on 1 January 2013, of the communes of Voultegon and Saint-Clémentin.

See also
Communes of the Deux-Sèvres department

References

Communes of Deux-Sèvres
Populated places established in 2013